13 Hours may refer to:

13 Hours (book), full title 13 Hours: The Inside Account of What Really Happened in Benghazi, a 2014 historical book by American author Mitchell Zuckoff made into a film
13 Hours: The Secret Soldiers of Benghazi, also known as 13 Hours, a 2016 film based on the book
13Hrs, also known by the name Night Wolf, a 2010 British horror film directed by Jonathan Glendening

See also
13 Hours by Air, also known as 20 Hours by Air, a 1936 drama film made by Paramount Pictures and directed by Mitchell Leisen
"13 Hours in Islamabad", tenth episode of the fourth season of the American television drama series Homeland, and the 46th episode overall.
Hour of 13, an American doom metal band
''The Hour of 13, a 1952 British historical mystery film directed by Harold French